"Dream Girl" is a song recorded by Kosovo-Albanian singer Butrint Imeri and German rapper Nimo, released as a single on 2 August 2019 by Universal URBAN. It was entirely written by both aforementioned artists together with Albanian producer Big Bang, who additionally handled the production process for the record. The official music video for the song was shot by Supercut Studio and was uploaded by Kosovo-Albanian record label AVD Digital onto YouTube on 1 August 2019 in order to accompany the single's release. It portrays the artists sailing across the sea by boat, afterwards in a mansion with a pool surrounded by women throughout the clip.

Background and composition 

Lasting two minutes and forty five seconds, "Dream Girl" was written by Butrint Imeri and Nimo alongside Kosovo-Albanian producer Big Bang, while the latter solely handled the production process for the song. It was composed in  time and is performed in the key of G major in common time with a tempo of 102 beats per minute.

Music video 

The accompanying music video for "Dream Girl" was premiered onto the YouTube channel of Imeri's label AVD Digital one day before the digital release on the 1 August 2019.

Personnel 
Credits adapted from YouTube and Tidal.

 Big Bang – producing, composing, songwriting
 Butrint Imeri – producing, composing, songwriting
 Nimo – producing, composing, songwriting

Charts

Release history

References 

2019 singles
2019 songs
Albanian-language songs
German-language songs
Song recordings produced by Big Bang
Music videos directed by Besian Durmishi